Khatunabad is a city in Kerman Province, Iran.

Khatunabad may also refer to:

Khatunabad, Bostanabad, East Azerbaijan Province
Khatunabad, Meyaneh, East Azerbaijan Province
Khatunabad, Sarab, East Azerbaijan Province
Khatunabad, Isfahan
Khatunabad, Anbarabad, Kerman Province
Khatunabad, Jiroft, Kerman Province
Khatunabad, Dehaj, Shahr-e Babak County, Kerman Province
Khatunabad-e Mohimi, Kerman Province
Khatunabad, Lorestan
Khatunabad, Qazvin
Khatunabad, Razavi Khorasan
Khatunabad, West Azerbaijan
Khatunabad Rural District (disambiguation)